Hypsopygia dharmsalae is a species of snout moth in the genus Hypsopygia. It was described by Arthur Gardiner Butler in 1889. It is found in India.

References

Moths described in 1889
Pyralini